Shouning County (Foochow Romanized: Sêu-nìng-gâing) is a small county located in the northeast of Fujian province of People's Republic of China, bordering Zhejiang province to the northeast. It is under the jurisdiction of Ningde City,  An Eastern Min dialect of Min Chinese (similar to the Fuzhou dialect) is spoken there.

There are a number of covered bridges located there, and of the 100 or so woven timber arch "lounge bridges" throughout China, Shouning County has 19. The county hosted the second international conference on Chinese covered bridges from September 20 to 23, 2007.

Beilu opera (also called Luantan), a variety of Min opera, is popular in Shouning County.

History 
Shouning County was first established in 1455, under the reign of the Jingtai Emperor of the Ming dynasty.

Administrative divisions
Shouning County comprises eight towns and six townships. These are then divided into 205 administrative villages.

Towns 

Townships

Climate

Economy 
As of 2019, Shouning County's gross domestic product totaled ¥10.06 billion, a 7.7% increase from 2018. Of this, animal husbandry and aquaculture comprised ¥2.82 billion, up 4.2% from 2018. The county's retail sales in 2019 totaled ¥3.28 billion, up 11.5% from 2018. As of 2019, the county's urban residents experienced a per capita disposable income of ¥28,023, a 9.1% increase from 2018; the county's rural residents had a per capita disposable income of ¥15,359, up 10.2% from 2018.

Notable people 
Feng Menglong, a famous Chinese writer, once served as the county magistrate of Shouning County.

In popular culture 

The film "Love on the Covered Bridge" was shot in Shouning County.

References

External links
Shouning County official site 
Covered bridges of Shouning County (PDF file)
Photo of covered bridge in Shouning County
Article about covered bridge symposium 
Articles about covered bridges 

County-level divisions of Fujian
Ningde